Zamansky is a surname. Notable people with the surname include:

Jake Zamansky (disambiguation), multiple people
Marc Zamansky (1916–1996), French mathematician
Vladimir Zamansky (born 1926), Russian actor